New Writings in SF 15 is an anthology of science fiction short stories edited by John Carnell, the fifteenth volume in a series of thirty, of which he edited the first twenty-one. It was first published in hardcover by Dennis Dobson in 1969, followed by a paperback edition issued under the slightly variant title New Writings in SF-15 by Corgi the same year.

The book collects six novelettes and short stories by various science fiction authors, with a foreword by Carnell. The third and fourth stories were later reprinted in the American edition of New Writings in SF 9.

Contents
"Foreword" (John Carnell)
"Report from Linelos" (Vincent King)
"The Interrogator" (Christopher Priest)
"When I Have Passed Away" (Joseph Green)
"Symbiote" (Michael G. Coney)
"The Trial" (Arthur Sellings)
"Therapy 2000" (Keith Roberts)

External links

1969 anthologies
15